Brazeulia is a genus of moths belonging to the family Tortricidae.

Species
Brazeulia joaquimana Razowski & Becker, 2000

See also
List of Tortricidae genera

References

 , 2000, Polskie Pismo Ent. 69: 340.
 , 2005, World Catalogue of Insects 5

External links
tortricidae.com

Euliini
Tortricidae genera